Deh-e Rahm (also Romanized as Deh-e Raḩm and Deh Raḩīm) is a village in Yusefvand Rural District, in the Central District of Selseleh County, Lorestan Province, Iran. At the 2006 census, its population was 475, in 97 families.

References 

Towns and villages in Selseleh County